Jens Egede Høyrup, born 1943 in Copenhagen, is a Danish historian of mathematics, specializing in pre-modern and early modern mathematics, ancient Mesopotamian mathematics in particular.  He is especially known for his interpretation of what has often been referred to as Old Babylonian "algebra" as consisting of concrete, geometric manipulations.

Career
Høyrup studied physics and mathematics at the University of Copenhagen, Niels Bohr Institute from 1962 to 1969 (also, in 1965/66, at the Institut Henri Poincaré in Paris), with a focus on theoretical physics. In 1969 he completed his studies (as Danish cand. Scient.) with a thesis on theoretical elementary particle physics and was assistant lecturer (Danish adjunkt) in physics at the Danish Academy for Engineering from 1971 to 1973.  Starting in 1973 he was senior lecturer (Danish lektor) and in 1989 reader (Danish docent) for the history and philosophy of science at Roskilde University, most recently in the Section for Philosophy and Science Studies. In 1995 he habilitated (danish dr. Phil.). Since 2005 he is professor emeritus. In 2008/09 he held the Sarton Chair in History of Science at the Ghent University.  He is currently Honorary Research Fellow at the Institute for the History of Natural Sciences of the Chinese Academy of Sciences and a visiting scholar at the Max Planck Institute for the History of Science in Berlin. In 2013, he was awarded the Kenneth O. May Medal and Prize of the International Commission on the History of Mathematics (ICHM) for "outstanding contributions to the history of mathematics".  He lives partly in Rome.

Scholarship
Høyrup is an internationally acclaimed expert in the history of mathematics, especially Babylonian mathematics.  His research is wide-ranging, and also includes studies of Greek, Latin, Chinese, medieval Islamic and European, and modern mathematics.  He is interested in philosophical and sociological questions about mathematics and the history of science. For example, he argues that early Babylonian arithmetic emerged from the process of state formation.  He has also written about mathematics and war.  More recently, he has studied the early Italian abacus tradition, arguing that its origins lie prior to Fibonacci's Liber Abacci and "that it is much less directly influenced by the scholarly level of Arabic mathematics than generally thought."

In the 1980s, Høyrup began a reanalysis of Old Babylonian "algebra", based on a close inspection of Babylonian arithmetical terminology.  He pioneered the use of "conformal translation" in this context, thereby preserving the distinctions between different conceptions of what had been regarded as equivalent mathematical operations.  He concluded, for example, the Babylonian mathematics includes two different additions and at least four different multiplications, and that these distinct operations corresponded to distinct cut-and-paste geometric operations with origins in the practical surveyor tradition.  Using this foundation, it became possible to understand texts that had previously been regarded as consisting of algebraic manipulations of abstract quantities as series of concrete operations on geometric figures.  For example, in Høyrup's reading, texts describing the process of completing the square are seen as instructions for cutting and pasting rectangular areas to form a square.

Selected works
 , 
 
 
 editor with Bernhelm Booss-Bavnbek: Mathematics and War, Birkhäuser 2003, doi:10.1007/978-3-0348-8093-0, 
 
 editor with Peter Damerow: Changing views on ancient Near Eastern mathematics, Berliner Beiträge zum Vorderen Orient Bd. 19, Dietrich Reimer 2001 (aus entsprechendem Seminar an der FU Berlin seit 1983)

Family 
Jens Høyrup is the son of Hans Egede Høyrup and Sonja Hedeager. He has two daughters from his previous marriage. He was later in a long relationship with the Italian professor Ludovika Koch.

References

External links 
 Jens Høyrup's home page, including publication list

1943 births
20th-century Danish historians
21st-century Danish historians
Danish historians of mathematics
Living people